The  is a  rural railway line in Iwate Prefecture, Japan, operated by the East Japan Railway Company (JR East). It connects Hanamaki Station in the city of Hanamaki with Kamaishi Station in the city of Kamaishi.

History

The original plan was to link with Kamaishi Mine and Kamaishi Port, but at an altitude of 887m, the mountain pass at Sennintōge prevented immediate expansion eastward to Kamaishi. A ropeway conveyor was used to convey goods onward to Ōhashi, from where a 16 km 762mm (2'6") gauge mining railway (which operated between 1915 and 1965) provided the service to Kamaishi.

The railway was nationalized in August 1936, and the line became the "Kamaishi Line". Motive power for the line was provided by six JNR Class 231 steam locomotives, built by Baldwin Locomotive Works in the USA, and numbered 231 to 236. The entire 90.2 km line was finally completed between Hanamaki and Kamaishi in June 1950, opening to traffic on 10 October of that year.

Stations
All stations are in Iwate Prefecture.

Closed stations
 , between Nitanai and Oyamada, 2.5 km east of Nitanai, opened 25 October 1913, closed 14 March 1985 when the nearby Shin-Hanamaki Station opened.

Rolling stock

Kamaishi Line services are operated using KiHa 110 series diesel trains.

From 12 April 2014, a newly formed SL Ginga "Joyful Train" (excursion train) began operating on the line at weekends using the restored JNR Class C58 steam locomotive C58 239 together with a train of four modified former KiHa 141 series diesel cars purchased from JR Hokkaido (themselves rebuilt from earlier 50 series passenger coaches and made surplus to requirements following the electrification of the Sasshō Line). The diesel cars provide additional power to cope with the line's gradients. The coach design work was overseen by industrial designer Ken Okuyama.

Former rolling stock
Following the full opening of the line in 1950, passenger and freight services on the line were hauled by JNR Class D50 2-8-2 steam locomotives, necessary to negotiate the steep gradients on the line of up 25 ‰. A couple of JNR Class 8620 steam locomotives were also used for shunting at Kamaishi Station. JNR Class C58 2-6-2 steam locomotives were also used on both passenger and freight services running to and from the Yamada Line. Six JNR Class D51 2-8-2 steam locomotives were subsequently transferred to the line, displacing some of the earlier D50s, but steam haulage on the line was entirely replaced by diesel haulage from March 1967.

References

 
Lines of East Japan Railway Company
1067 mm gauge railways in Japan
Rail transport in Iwate Prefecture
Railway lines opened in 1915